Yahoo! Philippines was the localized website of Yahoo! primarily catering to the Philippine market. It was launched on April 25, 2006.

The Yahoo! Philippines homepage was redirected to Yahoo! Singapore on June 2, 2015. However, in May 2017, Yahoo! Philippines returned with its newly redesigned homepage along with updates to Yahoo! News.

The Yahoo Philippines Facebook page was started on 20 March 2011.

References

External links

Philippines
Internet properties established in 2006
Internet properties disestablished in 2015